Bush hen is a name used for a number of bird species:

Plain bush-hen (Amaurornis olivacea)
Isabelline bush-hen (Amaurornis isabellina)
Talaud bush-hen (Amaurornis magnirostris)
Weka, (Gallirallus australis) a flightless bird endemic to New Zealand